The Choice of Hercules may refer to:
Hercules at the crossroads, ancient Greek parable also known as "The Choice of Hercules"
The Choice of Hercules (Beccafumi), c. 1520–1525 painting
The Choice of Hercules (Carracci), 1596 painting
The Choice of Hercules (Handel), 1750 oratorio